Victor Henry William Profitt (24 May 1898 – 20 October 1978) was an Australian rules footballer who played with Geelong in the Victorian Football League (VFL).

Notes

External links 

1898 births
1978 deaths
Australian rules footballers from Victoria (Australia)
Australian Rules footballers: place kick exponents
Geelong Football Club players